Talaytong Sor.Thanapet, is a Thai Muay Thai fighter.

Titles and accomplishments

Lumpinee Stadium
 2018 Lumpinee Stadium -154 lbs Champion
Professional Boxing Association of Thailand (PAT) 
 2018 Thailand - 154 lbs Champion
Channel 7 Stadium
 2018 Channel 7 Stadium -154 lbs Champion (1 defense)

Muay Thai record

|- style="background:#fbb" 
| 2023-01-21 || Loss ||align="left" | Petchmai SiadammooplaraRajadamnern || Samui Super Fight: Ruamponkon Samui, Phetchbuncha Stadium || Koh Samui, Thailand || Decision (unanimous) || 5 || 3:00

|-  style="background:#fbb;"
| 2022-11-26 || Loss||align=left| Petchkantat MUded || Ruamponkon Samui: Samui Super Fight Petchbuncha Stadium || Ko Samui, Thailand || Decision || 5 || 3:00  

|-  style="background:#fbb;"
| 2022-08-06 || Loss||align=left| Yodphupha Tor.Yotha || Road to ONE: Thailand 1, Lumpinee Stadium || Bangkok, Thailand || TKO (Punch)|| 1 || 2:36 
|-  style="background:#cfc;"
| 2022-06-25 || Win ||align=left|  Victor Guilherme || Fairtex, Lumpinee Stadium || Bangkok, Thailand || Decision || 5 || 3:00 
|-  style="background:#fbb;"
| 2022-05-07 || Loss ||align=left| Petchkantat MUded || TorNamThai TKO Kiatpetch, Lumpinee Stadium || Bangkok, Thailand || Decision|| 5 || 3:00  
|-
|-  style="background:#fbb;"
| 2022-02-26|| Loss||align=left| Luis Cajaiba || Muaythai Lumpinee TKO, Lumpinee Stadium || Bangkok, Thailand || Decision || 5 || 3:00
|-  style="background:#fbb;"
| 2021-11-20 || Loss ||align=left| Saenpon PetchpatcharaAcademy || Omnnoi Stadium || Samut Sakhon, Thailand || Decision || 5 || 3:00 
|-
! style=background:white colspan=9 |

|-  style="background:#cfc;"
| 2021-03-29 || Win ||align=left| Khunsuk Sitchefboontham || Chef Boontham, Rangsit Stadium || Rangsit, Thailand || Decision || 5 || 3:00
|-  style="background:#fbb;"
| 2020-02-12 || Loss ||align=left| Khunsuk Sitchefboontham || Rajadamnern Stadium || Bangkok, Thailand || Decision || 5 || 3:00
|-  style="background:#cfc;"
| 2019-12-29 || Win ||align=left| Sornkaw Puiplaninthong || Channel 7 Stadium || Bangkok, Thailand || Decision || 5 || 3:00
|-
! style=background:white colspan=9 |
|-  style="background:#fbb;"
| 2019-11-17 || Loss ||align=left| Sornkaw Puiplaninthong || Or.Tor.Gor3 Stadium || Nonthaburi province, Thailand || Decision || 5 || 3:00
|-  style="background:#fbb;"
| 2019-07-24|| Loss ||align=left| Luis Cajaiba|| Lumpinee Stadium || Bangkok, Thailand || Decision || 5 || 3:00
|-
! style=background:white colspan=9 |
|-  style="background:#fbb;"
| 2019-04-30 || Loss ||align=left| Jimmy Vienot || Lumpinee Stadium || Bangkok, Thailand || Decision || 5 || 3:00
|-
! style=background:white colspan=9 |
|-  style="background:#fbb;"
| 2019-03-30|| Loss||align=left| Wang Chao || Wu Lin Feng 2019: WLF x Lumpinee - China vs Thailand || Zhengzhou, China || TKO (Punches)|| 1 || 2:54
|-  style="background:#cfc;"
| 2019-01-10|| Win||align=left| Luis Cajaiba || Lumpinee Stadium || Bangkok, Thailand || Decision || 5 || 3:00
|-  style="background:#cfc;"
| 2018-11-30|| Win||align=left| Luis Cajaiba || Lumpinee Stadium || Bangkok, Thailand || Decision || 5 || 3:00
|-
! style=background:white colspan=9 |
|-  style="background:#cfc;"
| 2018-10-07 || Win ||align=left| Ruslan Ataev || Muay Thai Super Champ || Bangkok, Thailand || Decision || 3 || 3:00
|-  style="background:#cfc;"
| 2018-08-08 || Win ||align=left| Avatar Tor.Morsri || || Thailand || Decision || 5 || 3:00
|-
! style=background:white colspan=9 |
|- style="background:#fbb;"
| 2018-05-22|| Loss ||align=left| Youssef Boughanem || Lumpinee Stadium || Bangkok, Thailand || TKO || 4 || 
|-
! style=background:white colspan=9 |
|-  style="background:#cfc;"
| 2018-04-28 || Win ||align=left| Sorgraw Petchyindee ||Top King World Series 19, Final || Mahasarakham, Thailand || Decision || 3 || 3:00
|-  style="background:#cfc;"
| 2018-04-28 || Win ||align=left| Kongnakornbarn Sor.kitrungroj ||Top King World Series 19, Semi Final || Mahasarakham, Thailand || TKO (Knees) || 2 ||
|-  style="background:#cfc;"
| 2018-03-04 || Win ||align=left| Petchmakkok EminentGym || Channel 7 Stadium || Bangkok, Thailand || KO (Right Elbow) || 4 || 
|-
! style=background:white colspan=9 |
|-  style="background:#cfc;"
| 2018-01-14 || Win||align=left| Suayngam Pumpanmuang || Or.Tor.Gor3 Stadium || Nonthaburi province, Thailand || Decision || 5 || 3:00
|-  style="background:#cfc;"
| 2017-12-16 || Win ||align=left| Petchmakkok EminentGym ||  || Thailand || Decision || 5 || 3:00
|-  style="background:#fbb;"
| 2017-09-09 || Loss ||align=left| Arundej M16|| Lumpinee Stadium || Bangkok, Thailand || Decision || 5 || 3:00
|-  style="background:#fbb;"
| 2017-07-16 || Loss ||align=left| Diesellek Phetjinda|| Nonthaburi Stadium || Nonthaburi province, Thailand || KO (Right Elbow) || 4 ||
|-  style="background:#cfc;"
| 2017-05-06 || Win ||align=left| Sangsakda Sitjamew|| Lumpinee Stadium || Bangkok, Thailand || KO || 3 ||
|-  style="background:#cfc;"
| 2017-04-08|| Win||align=left| Chadd Collins || Lumpinee Stadium || Bangkok, Thailand || Decision || 5 || 3:00
|-  style="background:#fbb;"
| 2016-09-10|| Loss||align=left| Diesellek Aoodonmuang || Lumpinee Stadium ||  Bangkok, Thailand || KO || 4 ||
|-  style="background:#cfc;"
| 2016-08-22|| Win ||align=left| Diesellek Aoodonmuang ||  || Krasang District, Thailand || KO || 4 ||
|-  style="background:#cfc;"
| 2016-07-09 || Win ||align=left| Sang-Uthai Sor.Jor.Piek-Uthai || Lumpinee Stadium || Bangkok, Thailand || Decision || 5 || 3:00
|-  style="background:#cfc;"
| 2016-05-01 || Win ||align=left| Kwanchai Phetnirot || Rangsit Stadium || Rangsit, Thailand || Decision || 5 || 3:00
|-  style="background:#fbb;"
| 2016-03-20 || Loss ||align=left| Duangsompong Nayok-A-Thasala || Jitmuangnon Stadium || Samut Sakhon, Thailand || KO || 4 ||
|-  style="background:#cfc;"
| 2016-02-14 || Win ||align=left| Peemai Jitmuangnon || Rajadamnern Stadium || Bangkok, Thailand || Decision || 5 || 3:00
|-  style="background:#fbb;"
| 2016-01-17 || Loss ||align=left| Suayngarm Pumpanmuang || Jitmuangnon Stadium || Samut Sakhon, Thailand || Decision || 5 || 3:00
|-  style="background:#cfc;"
| 2015-10-26 || Win ||align=left| Koban Suranareegym || || Chiang Mai, Thailand || Decision || 5 || 3:00
|-  style="background:#cfc;"
| 2015-05-30 || Win ||align=left| Adelton Sor.Kiewsuk || Omnoi Stadium || Samut Sakhon, Thailand || Decision || 5 || 3:00
|-  style="background:#fbb;"
| 2014 || Loss ||align=left| Chanajon P.K.Saenchaimuaythaigym|| Omnoi Stadium - Isuzu Cup || Samut Sakhon, Thailand || Decision || 5 || 3:00
|-
| colspan=9 | Legend:

References

Talaytong Sor.Thanaphet
Living people
1993 births
Talaytong Sor.Thanaphet